William Edward Boeing (October 1, 1881 – September 28, 1956) was an American aviation pioneer who founded the Pacific Airplane Company in 1916, which a year later was renamed to The Boeing Company, now the largest exporter in the United States by dollar value and among the largest aerospace manufacturers in the world. William Boeing's first design was the Boeing Model 1 (or B & W Seaplane), which first flew in June 1916, a month before the company was founded. He also helped create the United Aircraft and Transport Corporation (known as "United Airlines" today) in 1929 and served as its chairman. He received the Daniel Guggenheim Medal in 1934 and was posthumously inducted in to the National Aviation Hall of Fame in 1966, ten years after his death.

Early life

William Boeing was born in Detroit, Michigan, to Marie M. Ortmann, from Vienna, Austria, and Wilhelm Böing (1846–1890) from Hohenlimburg, Germany. Wilhelm Böing emigrated to the United States in 1868 and initially worked as a laborer. His move to the United States was disliked by his father and he received no financial support. He later made a fortune from North Woods timber lands and iron ore mineral rights on the Mesabi Range of Minnesota, north of Lake Superior.

In 1890, when William was eight, his father died of influenza and his mother soon moved to Europe. Marie enrolled William Jr. and his sister at Schools in Switzerland.  He attended school in Vevey, Switzerland, and returned to the US for a year of prep school at St. Paul's School in Concord, New Hampshire
nearer Boston. William Boeing's mother remarried in 1898 and moved to Virginia. He enrolled at Yale University in New Haven, Connecticut, dropping out in 1903 to go into the lumber business.

Career
Boeing moved to Hoquiam, Washington, in the Pacific Northwest.  He was successful in the venture, in part by shipping lumber to the East Coast via the then-new Panama Canal, generating funds that he would later apply to a very different business.

While president of Greenwood Timber Company, Boeing, who had experimented with boat design, traveled to Seattle. During the Alaska-Yukon-Pacific Exposition in 1909, he saw a manned flying machine for the first time and became fascinated with aircraft. In 1910, at the Dominguez Flying Meet, Boeing asked every pilot foreign and domestic if he could go for an airplane ride and was repeatedly denied except for French aviator Louis Paulhan. Boeing waited and Paulhan finished the meet and left never giving Boeing his ride. 

Boeing took flying lessons at Glenn L. Martin Flying School in Los Angeles and purchased one of Martin's planes. Martin pilot James Floyd Smith traveled to Seattle to assemble Boeing's new Martin TA hydroaeroplane and continue to teach its owner to fly. Huge crates arrived by train and Smith assembled the plane in a tent hangar erected on the shore of Lake Union. Boeing's test pilot, Herb Munter, soon damaged the plane. 

When he was told by Martin that replacement parts would not be available for months, Boeing told his friend, Commander George Conrad Westervelt of the US Navy, "We could build a better plane ourselves and build it faster." Westervelt agreed. They soon built and flew the B & W Seaplane, an amphibian biplane that had outstanding performance. Boeing decided to go into the aircraft business, using an old boat works on the Duwamish River near Seattle for his factory.

Founding of Boeing Aircraft
In 1916, Boeing went into business with George Conrad Westervelt as "B & W" and founded Pacific Aero Products Co. The company's first plane was the Boeing Model 1 (B & W Seaplane). When America entered the First World War on April 8, 1917, Boeing changed the name to Boeing Airplane Company and obtained orders from the US Navy for 50 planes. At the end of the war, Boeing concentrated on commercial aircraft to service airmail contracts.

International airmail attempt
On March 3, 1919, Willam Boeing partnered with Eddie Hubbard to make the first delivery of international airmail to the United States. They flew a Boeing C-700 seaplane for the demonstration trip from Vancouver, British Columbia, to Seattle's Lake Union, carrying a bag of 60 letters from the Canadian post office for delivery in the U.S.

Boeing family
In 1921, Boeing married Bertha Marie Potter Paschall (1891-1977). She had previously been married to Nathaniel Paschall, a real estate broker with whom she had two sons, Nathaniel "Nat" Paschall Jr. and Cranston Paschall. The couple had a son of their own, William E. Boeing Jr. (1922–2015). The stepsons went into aviation manufacturing as a career. Nat Paschall was a sales manager for competitor Douglas Aircraft, which later became McDonnell Douglas. Bill Jr. became a private pilot and industrial real estate developer.

Bertha Boeing was the daughter of Howard Cranston Potter and Alice Kershaw Potter. Through her father, she was a descendant of the founders of Alex. Brown & Sons merchant bankers Alexander Brown, James Brown, and Brown's son-in-law and partner Howard Potter; and through her mother, the granddaughter of Charles James Kershaw and Mary Leavenworth Kershaw (a descendant of Henry Leavenworth).

Breakup of Boeing Group

In 1929, Boeing joined with Frederick Rentschler of Pratt & Whitney to form United Aircraft and Transport Corporation. The new grouping was a vertically integrated company with interests in all aspects of aviation, intending to serve all aviation markets. In a short time, it bought a host of small airlines, merging them with Boeing's pioneering airline under a holding company, United Air Lines.

In 1934, the United States government accused William Boeing of monopolistic practices. The same year, the Air Mail Act forced airplane companies to separate flight operations from development and manufacturing. William Boeing divested himself of ownership as his holding company, United Aircraft and Transport Corporation, broke into three separate entities:

 United Aircraft Corporation, holding the former eastern US manufacturing (later United Technologies Corporation)
 Boeing Airplane Company, with western US manufacturing, which later became The Boeing Company
 United Air Lines for flight operations

He began investing most of his time in his horses in 1937. Boeing Airplane Company, though a major manufacturer in a fragmented industry, did not become successful until the beginning of World War II.

Later life

Between 1935 and 1944, William Boeing and his wife Bertha set aside a large tract of land north of the Seattle city limits for subdivision, including the future communities of Richmond Beach, Richmond Heights, Innis Arden, Blue Ridge, and Shoreview. The Boeings placed racially restrictive covenants on their land to enforce segregation, forbidding properties from being "sold, conveyed, rented, or leased in whole or in part to any person not of the White or Caucasian race." Non-whites could only occupy a property on the land if they were employed as a domestic servant "by a person of the White or Caucasian race."

He spent the remainder of his life in property development and thoroughbred horse breeding. Concerned about the possibility of World War II battles in the Pacific Northwest, he purchased a  farm in the countryside east of Seattle, which he dubbed "Aldarra." The estate remained in the family until most of the land was developed into a golf course residential community in 2001. Several acres, however, remained in the family, including the Boeing's own and two smaller houses. His primary residence for most of his life, however, was a mansion in The Highlands community close to Seattle; the William E. Boeing House was later listed on the National Register of Historic Places. Boeing Creek running near this property bears his name.

On May 14, 1954, William Boeing and his wife Bertha went back to the Boeing Airplane Company to participate in the rollout ceremony for the Boeing 367-80 prototype.

William Boeing died on September 28, 1956, at the age of 74, three days before his 75th birthday. He was pronounced dead on arrival at the Seattle Yacht Club, having had a heart attack aboard his yacht, Taconite, in Puget Sound, Washington. His ashes were scattered off the coast of British Columbia, where he spent much of his time sailing.

He was posthumously inducted into the National Aviation Hall of Fame in Dayton, Ohio, in 1966.

In 1984, Boeing was inducted into the International Air & Space Hall of Fame at the San Diego Air & Space Museum. The Museum of Flight, in Seattle holds the William E. Boeing Sr. Papers; an archival collection of Boeing's textual and photographic materials.

See also
United States airmail service

References

Further reading
 Carl Cleveland, Boeing Trivia, (Seattle: CMC Books, 1989)
 Harold Mansfield, Vision: A Saga of the Sky (Duell, Sloan and Pearce, 1956)
 Robert Serling, Legend & Legacy: The Story of Boeing and Its People (New York: St. Martin's Press, 1992)

External links

1881 births
1956 deaths
American aerospace businesspeople
American aviation businesspeople
Boeing people
American company founders
American chairpersons of corporations
Aviation pioneers
Aircraft designers
American racehorse owners and breeders
Businesspeople in aviation
Businesspeople from Seattle
Chairmen of Boeing
American people of Austrian descent
American people of German descent
Businesspeople from Detroit
Yale School of Engineering & Applied Science alumni
National Aviation Hall of Fame inductees
People who died at sea
20th-century American businesspeople
Burials at sea